Following are lists of killings by law enforcement officers.

 List of killings by law enforcement officers in Canada
 List of killings by law enforcement officers in China
 List of killings by law enforcement officers in Germany
 List of killings by law enforcement officers in Poland
 List of killings by law enforcement officers in Sri Lanka
 List of killings by law enforcement officers in the United Kingdom
 List of killings by law enforcement officers in the United States

See also 

 Extrajudicial killings
 Encounter killings by police, a euphemism used in India and Pakistan to describe extrajudicial killings by the police or the armed forces of suspected gangsters or terrorists in gun battles
 Police brutality by country
 Suicide by cop

 
Killings by law enforcement officers
law enforcement